Wolf Paul Barth (20 October 1942, Wernigerode – 30 December 2016, Nuremberg) was a German mathematician who discovered Barth surfaces and whose work on vector bundles has been important for the ADHM construction. Until 2011 Barth was working in the Department of Mathematics at the University of Erlangen-Nuremberg in Germany.

Barth received a PhD degree in 1967 from the University of Göttingen. His dissertation, written under the direction of Reinhold Remmert
and Hans Grauert, was entitled Einige Eigenschaften analytischer Mengen in kompakten komplexen Mannigfaltigkeiten (Some properties of analytic sets in compact, complex manifolds).

Publications

See also
Barth surfaces
Barth–Nieto quintic

References

External links 
 

1942 births
2016 deaths
People from Wernigerode
20th-century German mathematicians
21st-century German mathematicians
Academic staff of the University of Erlangen-Nuremberg
Algebraic geometers
University of Göttingen alumni